Dude Ranch is the second studio album by American rock band Blink-182, released on June 17, 1997, by Cargo Music and MCA Records, making it their major record label debut. MCA signed the band in 1996 following moderate sales of their 1995 debut Cheshire Cat and their growing popularity in Australia. Dude Ranch was the band's final recording released on Cargo and the last to feature their full original lineup as drummer Scott Raynor was dismissed from the band in 1998.

The band recorded the album from December 1996 to January 1997 at Big Fish Studios in Encinitas, California with producer Mark Trombino. With lyrical material written on their nonstop tours over the previous years, as well as completed songs, the band recorded with Trombino in sessions that lasted for five weeks. During production, the members of Blink-182 were plagued with difficulties only made worse by the rushed schedule: bassist Mark Hoppus and guitarist Tom DeLonge, co-vocalists for the band, were having vocal problems and Raynor had to record his drum tracks with injuries to both feet.

The album was released in the summer of 1997 and was a success, reaching number 67 on the Billboard 200 and number one on the Top Heatseekers chart. The second single, "Dammit", became a rock radio hit single and helped the band gain mainstream credibility as they toured worldwide on the Vans Warped Tour. The band toured exhaustively behind the album, creating tensions which led to the firing of Raynor in mid-1998. Three more singles were released, with "Josie" gathering MTV play and charting highly in Australia. Dude Ranch eventually grew in sales and was certified platinum in the US by the end of the decade.

Background
The San Diego-based trio Blink-182 released their debut album, Cheshire Cat, in 1995. Released on local record label Cargo Music, the album sold well for an independent release; it had moved over 70,000 units by late 1996. Throughout 1995 and 1996, the trio vigorously toured nonstop and grew in popularity, most notably in Australia, where audiences embraced the band's irreverent sense of humor and stage shows. The trio grew frustrated when fans lamented the inability to purchase Cheshire Cat at their respective local record stores, and began searching for larger record labels with better distribution. Likewise, problems had become apparent between the trio and employees at Cargo, who largely considered the band a joke.  In contrast, the group had accumulated a genuine buzz among major labels, and a bidding war for the band began in March 1996. Several labels courted the group, sending A&R reps to shows and inviting the band to their offices for lunch meetings. With several labels interested, Blink-182 seriously considered Interscope, Epitaph, and MCA. The band contemplated their options: the three had no qualms signing to a major label, and were wary of purists attempting to define "punk". They felt a great affinity for Epitaph, as many of their favorite acts (Pennywise, Bad Religion, NOFX) were signed to the label. Overall, Blink felt they were nothing but honest regarding their ambitions: "I try and tell kids, 'The Clash, Sex Pistols and the Ramones did it, so how come we can't?" guitarist Tom DeLonge reasoned. "If people are bummed, we don't care. It's normally critics. Older critics."

MCA at the time was riding out a dead spell, and was derisively referred to in the music industry as MCA — Musicians' Cemetery of America. Despite this, their executives' persistence and sincerity won the band over, as well as their promise of complete artistic freedom. The trio signed a joint venture deal with MCA to distribute their sophomore album with Cargo. Drummer Scott Raynor was happy for the band's signing, but was uneasy with signing to a major label—he much preferred Epitaph, and when the band passed over the label, he began to feel only half-invested in the band. Raynor was not, however, difficult about the band's mainstream growth: "I didn't measure success in terms of oppositional credibility. I loved being on the radio and MTV. We were certified products of pop culture, born and bred in suburbia." Thanks to their established fan base and merchandising, MCA did not intervene much in the band's activities. Although the label had granted the band artistic freedom in their contract, MCA did step in and warn the band when they planned to feature a spoof of the "Macarena" on Dude Ranch, humorously titled "Hey Wipe Your Anus".

To celebrate their signing, the group held a party at the Hotel del Coronado in San Diego. At the event, Raynor became inebriated and jumped off a balcony. He broke both his heels and was forced to record Dude Ranch while in a wheelchair. Soon, the band booked time at DML Studios in Escondido, California, where they worked out arrangements for the songs on Dude Ranch. Most of the lyrics for the album had been written over 1995 and 1996, while touring. "I remember writing most of those songs in my living room, sitting on a  curb, whatever," recalled DeLonge in 2001. "Back then, each song was pretty much written with a specific girl or event in mind." Demos for the album were recorded with Warren Fitzgerald of the Vandals; early versions of "Enthused" and "Lemmings" were released on the "Wasting Time" single and the Lemmings / Going Nowhere split EP, respectively.

Recording and production

The band were afforded more time to record than previous endeavors, and were listening to music such as Jawbreaker, Bad Religion and Lagwagon, which influenced the album. For production duties, the band worked with Mark Trombino, who provided additional piano and keyboards on Dude Ranch. The trio picked him based on his work he had done on Jimmy Eat World's Static Prevails (1996). The group spent time trying to amuse Trombino, to no avail. Hoppus' sister, Anne Hoppus, described Trombino as very quiet during the sessions. Trombino, in a retrospective piece about the album, mentioned that he was "excited, but also nervous and intimidated. I felt weird that there were these guys who had sold way more records than I had ever sold and I'm sitting in the producer’s chair telling them what to do." Dude Ranch was recorded at Big Fish Studios in Rancho Santa Fe, California in December 1996. Big Fish was a converted guesthouse which had just survived a wildfire months before. However, the gloomy atmosphere did not faze Blink-182 at all, and what was a tragedy to local individuals became fodder for jokes for the group. Bassist Mark Hoppus had just bought a new video camera and he filmed stunts with guitarist Tom DeLonge on the burnt landscape in spare time. Despite this, Trombino was impressed by their work ethic: "They were the most business-centric band I'd ever seen at that point. They had their shit together."

Despite the creative boom while writing lyrics for the album, all three members of Blink-182 faced setbacks while recording Dude Ranch. DeLonge was having vocal problems and spent much time recording and re-recording vocal tracks, and Hoppus realized he too was having difficulty singing after losing his voice during a one-off Christmas concert. Hoppus realized the magnitude of the situation and cancelled the final week of recording in December 1996. He quit smoking in order to take care of his voice, which was stressed due to lack of vocal warm-ups, full days of vocal tracks, and the strain of singing for "Dammit", which was accidentally written just outside his vocal range. Meanwhile, Raynor had to record his drum tracks while still in his wheelchair, the result of injuries sustained at the signing party. He would wheelchair up to the drum set and scoot onto the drum throne and play," remembered Trombino in a later interview. "I got the sense that [the band] were bummed." Aside from the recording, the band spent time playing Crash Bandicoot and "reading the articles from the shelves and shelves of Playboys that the studio had thoughtfully provided." The group ate lunch nearly each day at Sombrero, a local Mexican restaurant namedropped in "Josie", and Chinese for dinner from Encinitas' Pick Up Stix.

It would be January 1997 by the time the band was able to wrap up sessions for Dude Ranch, eventually amounting to five weeks of recording. For the final touches, Unwritten Law frontman Scott Russo donated a few vocal tracks to "Josie", and Trombino let Blink-182 record a couple of jokes between songs using a sound-effects machine he owned. The group contacted Fletcher Dragge of Pennywise to find someone to remix a few tracks from the album, and he suggested Donnell Cameron of Track Recording Studios. The band went in to Track and re-recorded Raynor's drum tracks for several songs. Representatives from MCA dropped by on occasion and were excited by the material they heard.  "When we were in there mixing, the A&R person would come by," remembered Cameron. "I don't think the band really knew what they had but certainly the label knew they had so many good songs on the record." DeLonge remembered it differently: "[Label executives] fucking hated pop-punk. They wanted nothing to do with it. They were into Pavement or whatever." After production completed, the album was mastered by Brian Gardner at Bernie Grundman Mastering in Hollywood. In 2001, Hoppus recalled, "I remember when we finished Dude Ranch I was so proud. That was the first time we could take the time and whatever to make a good record."  In addition to the record, Trombino produced "I Won't Be Home for Christmas", a Christmas song recorded during the Dude Ranch sessions.

Music and packaging

According to music critic Stephen Thomas Erlewine, Dude Ranch is an album of "juvenile, adrenaline-fueled punk-pop." Billboard magazine's Doug Reece described it as "a collection of machine-gun-quick, energetic punk songs—sometimes with a puerile slant—about such topics as girlfriends, broken hearts, and fights with one's parents." At Alternative Press, it was characterized as a "killer skate-punk record". Greg Simpsons at Punknews.org too labeled it skate punk, stating that the album "set [the] blueprint for their style of poppy, goofy skate punk that they would later bring to the masses." DeLonge considered the album a step up in terms of songwriting, with "Dammit" proving the breakthrough to him.

"Pathetic" has been considered a tale of "abject self-pity in the face of collapsed relationship." "Pathetic" is also reportedly about DeLonge's mother being disappointed about how DeLonge was doing in high school and college. The distinctive riff of "Dammit" was created when Hoppus was forced to skip over the missing two strings on an acoustic guitar. The song's theme is maturity, exemplified by the refrain, "Well, I guess this is growing up." "Dick Lips" was named after an insult the trio bandied around at Big Fish during recording. It was written about DeLonge's experience when he was kicked out of Poway High School for showing up to a basketball game while intoxicated. "Waggy" was a word Hoppus created while belching, prompting him to name the song with it. "Untitled" has been considered a tribute to the emerging ska punk scene, and "Emo" by its namesake, which is partly a tribute to DeLonge's favorite band at that time, Jimmy Eat World.

"Apple Shampoo" was inspired by Elyse Rogers of Dance Hall Crashers, whom Hoppus dated; the title is culled from a particular brand of shampoo she often used. "Josie" makes further reference to Dance Hall Crashers and the band Unwritten Law ("My girlfriend likes UL and DHC"). "A New Hope" takes the standard rock subject matter of a hopeless crush and rewrites it with details of the Star Wars series. The original Star Wars trilogy were popular during Hoppus' childhood into the late 1970s and early 1980s, and a theatrical re-release in the late 1990s reinvigorated interest in the series. "Degenerate" is a re-recording of a track that first appeared on the band's demo cassette Demo No.2. "Lemmings" is another re-recorded track, which had previously only been available on a 7-inch. The band felt the song was strong enough that it should not be limited to those owning record players.

The cover design, a collage by artist Lou Beach, features a bull with the band's name branded on its rear end, while the packaging is decorated by images of the band as cowboys on a "dude ranch". The gatefold packaging features a painting stating "Greetings from the Blink-182 Dude Ranch," which was intended to be a pastiche of both "cheesy postcards" and a parody of Bruce Springsteen's Greetings from Asbury Park, N.J.. Art direction for the album was headed by Tim Stedman, with Stedman and graphic designer Ashley Pigford designing the package. The CD art, a revolver chamber, was designed by artist Victor Gastelum, while the band photography was done by Steven Shea. DeLonge recalled in 2012 that the only "bad" aspect of Dude Ranch in retrospect were the jokes found within the inside artwork: "I remember sitting at the Sombrero taco shop going, 'Fuck, we’ve got to finish off our album cover, let’s just write some jokes to these cowboy pictures.' Why did we do that? We should have had better jokes for those pictures."

Release

Dude Ranch was released on June 17, 1997, jointly through Cargo Music and MCA Records. The record, at first, largely passed without notice from audiences outside their established fan base. With fan support and the trio touring nonstop, the album's sales began to improve. The momentum from touring helped Dude Ranch sell 3,000–4,000 units a week, and the record sold 40,000 copies by August 1997. Dude Ranch was promoted by the label through board-sport magazines and tie-ins between surf shops and record stores. At retail, MCA and Cargo organized midnight sales promotions on the West Coast. The popularity of the trio in Australia has been cited as the sign that alerted major record companies of Dude Ranch commercial potential; at the time, the album had spent five months on the charts and the band became famous for their stage show while on the 1997 Warped Tour. Thanks to increased recognition, the band dropped Cargo and fully signed with MCA in 1998 to handle increased distribution. Punk rock purists asserted the band were betraying their indie roots by even considering major label proposals and began to address the band as "sell-outs".

Sales improved dramatically when the record's lead single, "Dammit", began making rounds at rock radio. MCA's marketing strategy involved waiting until after the band's Warped Tour performances wrapped in order to have a retail story to back up radio promotion efforts. The label first serviced "Dammit" in August 1997 and several SoCal stations were quick to pick up the single, finding it to be a good match alongside Green Day and The Offspring radio hits. The song was released in September, and was added to the playlist of Los Angeles-based radio station KROQ, after which the song began to be played across the country. Mainstream rock received "Dammit" in November, and MTV picked up the "Dammit" video, bumping it into "stress rotation" in December. This led to feature stories in magazines such as Billboard and Rolling Stone. Radio-wise, "Dammit" achieved great commercial success, peaking at number 11 on the US rock charts in 1998. The year-end Billboard Airplay Monitor Report (BDS) stats indicated that "Dammit" earned top spins at many key radio stations. In addition, its success knocked Dude Ranch onto the album Billboard 200 album chart for the first time, where it peaked at number 67 in February 1998. On January 24, 1998, Billboard reported that Dude Ranch sold more than 268,000 copies, according to Nielsen SoundScan.

Dude Ranch, which was certified gold by the Recording Industry Association of America (RIAA) on February 9, 1998, yielded three more singles, which did not attract the same commercial success as "Dammit". "Apple Shampoo" was the second single release from Dude Ranch, released in October 1997. "Although it didn't have the impact of "Dammit", it hardly mattered as the former was still receiving heavy play on radio and TV stations across the nation", wrote journalist Joe Shooman. "Dick Lips" was released in February 1998 but failed to register on charts. "Josie" became the record's fourth and final single in November 1998. Its music video also received MTV airplay and the single charted at number 31 in Australia. For the single release of both "Dammit" and "Josie", the songs were remixed and remastered by Tom Lord-Alge. The unreleased Dude Ranch cut "I Won't Be Home for Christmas" was released as an international single in 2001, only successful in Canada, but charting for six non-consecutive weeks at number one. Dude Ranch was certified platinum by the RIAA on November 8, 1999. As of June 30, 2001, Dude Ranch sold 1,100,000 copies, according to Nielsen SoundScan.

Reception

Dude Ranch was released when the band was only achieving moderate success, and very few critical reviews of the record were published in 1997. A CMJ write-up commented, "Dude Ranch has the hooks and sonic wallop to rocket Blink-182 into stadiums throughout the nation." British rock magazine Kerrang! published a negative early review: the reviewer laments the disc's "little depth, passion, soul and even vaguely memorable hooks." Later reviews were subsequently more positive. Rolling Stone regarded Dude Ranch as the moment "the trio focused and refined their pop-punk sound," summarizing the record's themes: "bassist Mark Hoppus plays the straight man, singing sturdily and deadpan, while the squeakier-voiced guitarist Tom DeLonge bleats urgently about romance gone wrong." The website AbsolutePunk placed the album on their "Absolute Classics" list in February 2009, calling it a "classic mix" that was successful due to timing. In 2011, a writer for Total Guitar referred to the record as "a genuine modern punk classic," while Scott Heisel of Alternative Press called it a "quantum leap in sonic quality and songwriting."

In a 20th anniversary piece celebrating the album, Maria Sherman, writing for MTV News, commented that on Dude Ranch the trio "found a subversive way to embrace lameness as something to be commended—a language all outsiders could understand." Over time, the album has proved influential. Trevor Kelley from Alternative Press credited it with "reigniting" the pop punk movement while calling it a "huge source of inspiration for a new generation of bands," such as Midtown and New Found Glory. Panic! at the Disco guitarist Ryan Ross has cited the album as his first influence: "I wanted to learn how to play like Tom DeLonge."

Accolades

* denotes an unordered list

Touring
Beginning in the summer of 1997, Blink-182 would enter an extended period of touring. The group had played a handful of dates on the Vans Warped Tour 1996, a lifestyle tour promoting skateboarding and punk rock music. However, upon Dude Ranch release and popularity, Blink-182 would play every date of the 1997 tour worldwide with influences Pennywise, NOFX, and Social Distortion. "The Warped Tour is really more of a traveling-band barbecue," commented DeLonge. "You hang out with the other bands all day, you play your set, and then hang out again." In late 1997 and early 1998, the band would be on the road for nine months straight, only coming home to San Diego for days at a time before striking out on the next tour. "When we did our longest tour stretch, it was right when I started dating my fiancee," recalled DeLonge. "We were all new and in love, and I had to leave. It was just, 'Hey, I'll see you in nine months.' It was really hard." In addition to the hefty touring schedule, the trio grew tired of other commitments, including interviews and TV appearances due to the success of "Dammit".

Desperate for a break, the overworked band began to argue and tensions formed. Raynor, who was at the center of this drama, had been commenting of his desire to attend college for years, and had been taking homework out with him on tour to try and complete his high school diploma. The tension came to a head in February 1998 as the band embarked on SnoCore 98, described as "a winter version of the Warped Tour." Sharing the stage with Primus, the band was enjoying more success than ever before, but the drama between the musicians had grown substantially. The band reached a low point when the band engaged in a fight on a Nebraska date after SnoCore's conclusion. Shortly after the conclusion of SnoCore was a short minitour along the western coast, most notably Southern California, the band's favorite place to play. The tour ended with the band headlining a sold-out show at the Palladium in Hollywood, California, where the band had dreamed of performing at for years.

Raynor suffered a "tragic loss" during the West Coast minitour and flew home, forcing the band to find a fill-in drummer: Travis Barker of the ska punk support band The Aquabats. Barker learned the drum tracks for the band's set in only 45 minutes prior to his first show. Raynor returned for the band's Hollywood Palladium performance, and the band became increasingly uneasy and arguments grew worse. To offset personal issues, Raynor began to drink heavily and it began to affect the band's performances. Following a largely successful Australian tour in the spring, Hoppus and DeLonge presented an ultimatum: quit drinking or go to an  rehab. Raynor agreed to both and informed the band of his decision after taking the weekend to mull options. According to Raynor, he was fired through a phone call despite his agreement to rehab. Despite this, he felt no malice toward his former bandmates and conceded they were "right" to fire him.

The band would minimize the impact of the situation in future interviews and remained vague regarding his departure. The "Josie" CD single, released in the US in November 1998, was the first Blink-182 release to feature Barker in any capacity (he is pictured on the back cover alongside Hoppus and DeLonge). Barker would join Blink-182 full-time in the summer of 1998 and toured with the band for the remainder of the year, playing sold-out shows across America on the PooPoo PeePee Tour.

Track listing

Personnel

Blink-182
 Mark Hoppus – bass guitar, vocals
 Tom DeLonge – guitars, vocals
 Scott Raynor – drums, percussion

Additional musicians
 Scott Russo – backing vocals
 Mark Trombino – piano, keyboards

Production
 Mark Trombino – production, recording, mixing
 Donnell Cameron – mixing ("Pathetic", "Boring", "Enthused", "Josie", "A New Hope" and "I'm Sorry")
 Brian Gardner – mastering

Artwork
 Tim Stedman – art direction, design
 Lou Beach – cover illustration
 Ashley Pigford – design
 Steve Shea – band photos
 Victor Gastelum – disc art
 Carl Otto – skateboard art, design

Charts

Weekly charts

Year-end charts

Certifications

Notes

References

External links

 Dude Ranch at YouTube (streamed copy where licensed)

Blink-182 albums
MCA Records albums
1997 albums
Albums produced by Mark Trombino
Cargo Music albums